The 1992–93 North West Counties Football League season was the 11th in the history of the North West Counties Football League, a football competition in England. Teams were divided into two divisions: Division One and Division Two.

Division One 

Division One featured eight new teams, promoted from Division Two:

 Bamber Bridge
 Blackpool Mechanics
 Burscough
 Chadderton
 Glossop North End
 Kidsgrove Athletic
 Newcastle Town
 Salford City

League table

Division Two 

Division Two featured eight new teams:

 Bootle, relegated from Division One
 Burnley Bank Hall, promoted as champions of the West Lancashire League Division One
 Ellesmere Port Town, a new team
 Irlam Town, demoted from the NPL Division One
 K Chell, promoted as champions of the West Midlands (Regional) League Division Two
 Nelson, joined from the West Lancashire Football League
 North Trafford, promoted as fourth in the Mid-Cheshire League Division One
 Stantondale, promoted as third in the Liverpool County Combination Division One

League table

References

External links 
 NWCFL Official Site

North West Counties Football League seasons
8